This list of lakes in Hesse includes lakes, bathing lakes, reservoirs and ponds in the German state of Hesse.

A 
Aartalsee

B 
Borkener See

D 
Diemelsee (together with North Rhine-Westphalia)

E 
Edersee

G 
Gombether See
Grüner See

N 
Niederwaldsee

R 
Riedsee bei Leeheim

S 

Seeweiher
Singliser See
Stellbergsee
Stockelache

T 
Twistesee

See also 

 List of lakes of Germany

External links 

 pdf Hessisches Ministerium für Umwelt, ländlichen Raum und Verbrauerschutz: Hessische Badegewässer

!List of lakes of Hesse
Hesse